"Jesus, Take a Hold"  is a song written and performed by American country music artist Merle Haggard and The Strangers.  It was released in June 1970 as the first single from the album Hag.  The song peaked at number three on the U.S. Billboard Hot Country Singles chart and peaked at number seven on the Bubbling Under Hot 100. It reached three on the Canadian RPM Country Tracks.

Personnel
Merle Haggard– vocals, guitar

The Strangers:
Roy Nichols – lead guitar
Norman Hamlet – steel guitar, dobro
Bobby Wayne - rhythm guitar, harmony vocals
Dennis Hromek – bass, background vocals
Biff Adam – drums

Chart performance

References

1970 singles
1970 songs
Merle Haggard songs
Songs written by Merle Haggard
Song recordings produced by Ken Nelson (American record producer)
Capitol Records singles